Spencer Thomas Bernard (February 5, 1918 – March 9, 2001) was an American politician from the U.S. state of Oklahoma. Bernard served as the 11th lieutenant governor of Oklahoma from 1979 to 1987. He also served in the Oklahoma House of Representatives.

Early life and private career
Bernard was born February 5, 1918.
Bernard operated a peanut-processing plant and a farming and ranching operation in Rush Springs.

Political career
Bernard was elected to the Oklahoma House of Representatives as a Democrat in 1960. He served 18 years, six of which were as speaker pro tempore, the second-in-command leadership position in the Oklahoma House of Representatives.

Having prevailed with 25% as first in a wide field of primary candidates and won the runoff with 63% against State Auditor Gladys Warren, he was elected lieutenant governor in 1978 with considerable margin of 57.8% to 39.7% over his Republican opponent Terry Campbell. In his first term, he arranged for more than $14 million in agricultural exports to Taiwan. In his reelection campaign in 1982, he defeated Democratic primary opponents John Rogers, a former secretary of state from Oklahoma City, and Rodney Ray of Jenks, Oklahoma and won the general election against Norman Lamb, increasing his result to 61%.

Death
Bernard died on March 9, 2001, and was buried in the Rush Springs Cemetery in Rush Springs, Oklahoma.

References

1918 births
2001 deaths
Lieutenant Governors of Oklahoma
20th-century Members of the Oklahoma House of Representatives
20th-century American politicians
Democratic Party members of the Oklahoma House of Representatives